Mattias Norlinder (born 12 April 2000) is a Swedish professional ice hockey defenceman currently playing for Laval Rocket in the American Hockey League (AHL), while under contract as a prospect to the Montreal Canadiens in the National Hockey League (NHL). He was drafted 64th overall by the Canadiens in the third round of the 2019 NHL Entry Draft.

Playing career

Europe 

As a youth, Norlinder played junior hockey for Modo Hockey in the J20 SuperElit, winning the 2019 J20 SuperElit championship.

He made his professional debut for Modo in the HockeyAllsvenskan during the 2018–19 season, playing 14 games with two goals and four assists. In March 2019, he signed a one-year professional contract with Modo. In the 2019–20 HockeyAllsvenskan season, he played 34 games for Modo with seven goals and eleven assists. Despite missing time with a concussion, he was named the best Junior (Guldgallret) in the HockeyAllsvenskan that season.

He was loaned to Frölunda HC in the 2020–21 SHL season, playing 37 games with five goals and five assists after missing time with a shoulder and a knee injury.

North America 

After being drafted 64th overall by the Montreal Canadiens in the third round of the 2019 NHL Entry Draft, the Canadiens signed Norlinder to a three-year entry-level contract on 3 June 2021.

On 6 November 2021, Norlinder made his North American professional debut with the Canadien's AHL affiliate, Laval Rocket, in a 4–0 loss against the Syracuse Crunch. Norlinder made his NHL debut with the Canadiens in a 6–0 loss against the Pittsburgh Penguins on 18 November 2021. On 27 November 2021, he scored his first NHL  point with an assist in a 6–3 win against the Penguins. Having played six games with the Canadiens before returning to the Rocket, Norlinder was later reassigned on loan to continue his development and return to Swedish club, Frölunda HC, for the remainder of the season on 16 December 2021.

International play 

Norlinder represented Sweden men's national junior ice hockey team at the 2020 World Junior Ice Hockey Championships, winning a bronze medal. He made his senior national team debut at the 2020 Karjala Tournament in the Euro Hockey Tour.

Personal life 

Norlinder's younger brother, Linus, is also a hockey player.

Career statistics

Regular season and playoffs

International

Awards and honors

References

External links 

 

2000 births
Living people
Frölunda HC players
Laval Rocket players
Modo Hockey players
Montreal Canadiens draft picks
Montreal Canadiens players
People from Kramfors Municipality
Swedish ice hockey defencemen
Sportspeople from Västernorrland County